Switzers may refer to:
 Swiss people, of Switzerland
 Swiss mercenaries, in older usage
 Switzers, New Zealand, now known as Waikaia, a town in New Zealand

See also 
 Switzer (disambiguation)